Oakbank School is a coeducational secondary school located in the hamlet of Ryeish Green (near Spencers Wood) in Berkshire, England.

History
The first school on the site was called 'Three Mile Cross Primary School' when it was built in 1911. It originally taught pupils aged 5 to 14 years. Its first headmaster was Mr Reeley. After World War II, the school modernised, expanded and amalgamated with a school in Spencers Wood (which is now the village library) to become a senior school. The school later was renamed 'Ryeish Green School'.

Ryeish Green School was closed in 2010. Wokingham Borough Council closed the school after it experienced falling student numbers; the school saw a reduction of approximately 150 students over a four-year period from 2002 to 2006. In 2007, an independent candidate stood in the local council elections running on a Save Ryeish Green School ticket.  Although both Labour and Liberal candidates stood down in favour of him, he fell a few votes short of the Conservative candidate who supported the school's closure.

In September 2012, 'Oakbank School', a free school opened on the site formerly occupied by Ryeish Green School.

References

External links 
 

Secondary schools in the Borough of Wokingham
Free schools in England